Alexandra Kamp-Groeneveld (born 29 December 1966) is a German model and actress.

Biography

She was born in Karlsruhe to Peter Kamp and his wife and grew up in Baden-Baden. She visited drama schools in New York, Los Angeles and Paris before she started her career as an actress in 1994.  She has had many star and supporting roles in German movies and TV series and some in Hollywood B-movies. In 1998, she acted together with Claudia Cardinale in Riches, belles, etc., in 2001 with Leslie Nielsen in 2001: A Space Travesty and in 2003 she played the star role in Sumuru together with Michael Shanks in an English-South African co-production. In 2007 she appeared as a covergirl on the German issue of the Playboy.
Alexandra is the spokeswoman for the children's hospital "Kinderhospiz St. Nikolaus" in the Bavarian Alps, which gives a care home to terminally ill children and their parents.
She frequently gives charity readings.

Filmography

Alle lieben Julia (1994, TV series, 26 episodes), as Liz
Eine Frau wird gejagt (1995, TV series), as Fränzi Belling
Küsse niemals deinen Chef (1997, TV series)
Eine Lüge zuviel (1998, TV), as Britta Burkhard
Riches, belles, etc. (1998)
Fieber – Ärzte für das Leben (1998-2000, TV series, 23 episodes), as Dr. Sybille Alberich
Ich liebe eine Hure (1998, TV film), as Lissy Seibold
Der Kopp (1999, TV film), as Tanja Pollack
Morgen gehört der Himmel dir (1999, TV film), as Anne
Tatort: Licht und Schatten (1999, TV), as F. Timmermann
Thrill – Spiel um dein Leben (2000, TV film) as Corinna Diering
2001: A Space Travesty (2001), as Dr. Uschi Künstler
Barbara Wood: Traumzeit (2001, TV film), as Joanna Williams
Shadow Fury (2001), as Dr. Louise Forster
Antonia – Zwischen Liebe und Macht (2001, TV film), as Antonia Scherrer
The Red Phone: Manhunt (2002, TV film), as Diana
Sehnsucht nach Sandin (2002, TV film), as Anne Berentzen
Half Past Dead (2002), as Reporter
Deep Freeze (2002), as Dr. Monica Kelsey
Ein himmliches Weihnachtsgeschenk (2002, TV film), as Sabine Pitzel
Antonia – Tränen im Paradies (2003, TV film), as Countess Antonia von Ahrendorff
Sumuru (2003), as Sumuru
Mary Higgins Clark: A Crime of Passion (2003, TV film), as Arabella Young
Ein Baby für dich (2004, TV film), as Ulrike Kunert
Dracula 3000 (2004, TV film), as Mina Murry
: Wer schön sein will, muss sterben (2005, TV), as Heike Berger
Karl May Festival in Bad Segeberg: Winnetou III (2006), as Dr. Kate Brody
Um Himmels Willen: Traumfrau (2006, TV), as Monika Saint Claire
Zoo Doctor: My Mom the Vet (2008, TV series, 5 episodes), as Dr. Lena Weingarten

External links

Official website in German

1966 births
Living people
German female models
German film actresses
People from Baden-Baden
German television actresses
20th-century German actresses
21st-century German actresses